Arthrostylidium pubescens is a species of Arthrostylidium bamboo in the grass family.

Distribution 
Arthrostylidium pubescens is native to Puerto Rico and Venezuela.

References 

pubescens
Flora of Puerto Rico
Flora of Venezuela
Flora without expected TNC conservation status